Starcatcher may refer to:
certain characters in the 2004 Peter Pan prequel Peter and the Starcatchers
(also in the stage adaptation Peter and the Starcatcher)
Star Catcher, a My Little Pony character/toy introduced in 2004
Star Catcher, thoroughbred racehorse
Starcatcher, the Transformers character/toy introduced in 2007